Café de Paris sauce is a butter-based sauce served with grilled beef. When it is served with the sliced portion of an entrecôte (in American English: a rib eye steak) or a faux-filet (in English: a sirloin steak) the resulting dish is known as "entrecôte Café de Paris".

History
The sauce was first popularised in the 1930s by the Café de Paris restaurant in Geneva, then owned by Arthur-François (Freddy) Dumont, and entrecôte Café de Paris remains the restaurant's speciality. The Café de Paris attributes the origin of the sauce to Mr Dumont's father-in-law, Mr Boubier. 
Today the restaurant also ships the sauce to several other restaurants which serve it under licence: the Café de Paris in Lausanne, the À l'Entrecôte in Sion (Switzerland), the Brasserie L'Entrecôte in Lisbon and Porto, and the Entrecôte Café de Paris restaurants in Dubai, Kuwait, Riyadh and Hong Kong.

A closely similar sauce is also served by the Entrecôte groups of restaurants operated by the descendants of Paul Gineste de Saurs in Paris, Geneva, Toulouse, Lyon, Madrid, London, New York, Beirut, Doha, Dubai, Riyadh, and other cities.

Ingredients and preparation

Both the Café de Paris and the Entrecôte groups of restaurants consider the sauce's ingredients and method of preparation to be a trade secret.

The Paris newspaper Le Monde reports that the sauce as served by Le Relais de Venise – L'Entrecôte is made from poultry livers, fresh thyme and thyme flowers, full cream (19 percent butterfat), white Dijon mustard, butter, water, salt, and pepper.

 According to Le Monde, the recipe involves heating one pan with the livers and thyme until they start to change colour. In a second pan, the cream is reduced on low heat with the mustard and infused with the flavour of the thyme flowers. It is then blended and pressed through a fine strainer into the reduced cream. As the sauce thickens, the butter is incorporated into it with a little water, it is beaten smooth, and fresh-ground salt and pepper are added. The London newspaper The Independent, however, reports that the proprietor of Le Relais de Venise – L'Entrecôte has dismissed the Le Monde report as inaccurate.

The Café de Paris serves its entrecôte on a bed of the sauce, on a platter kept hot atop a trivet with a warming candle in the base. Initially the sauce is a stiff whipped froth, tawny in colour, but as it melts down to a liquid it reverts to its natural creamy pea-soup-green colour. At the Entrecôte groups of restaurants, the sauce is served as a creamy pea-soup-green liquid from the outset rather than as a whipped froth, it is less prone to separate, and it is less salty.

Café de Paris butter

Quite distinct from the classic Café de Paris sauce are various compound butters commonly referred to as Café de Paris butter. Café de Paris is usually shaped into a log and then chilled, which slices are taken off to be placed onto a hot steak. It typically contain a mixture of herbs, spices, and other condiments such as mustard, marjoram, dill, rosemary, tarragon, paprika, capers, chives, curry powder, parsley, shallot, garlic, Worcestershire sauce, and anchovies, all whipped into the butter. The resulting compound butter is shaped into a roll using aluminium foil and chilled. When the dish is served, a piece of the butter is sliced off and allowed to melt on the hot meat.

See also

 L'Entrecôte
 List of sauces
 Steak frites

References

Steak sauces
Swiss cuisine
Butter